Bharat Barot is an Indian Politician and Member of Legislative assembly from Dariyapur Kazipur constituency in Gujarat for its 12th legislative assembly. He is the BJP candidate for legislative assembly election 2017 standing in competition against Congress candidate Gyasuddin shaikh.

Political career
Bharat Barot started his career as student activist associated with Bharatiya Janata Yuva Morcha (BJYM).

References

Living people
Bharatiya Janata Party politicians from Gujarat
Gujarat MLAs 2007–2012
Year of birth missing (living people)